Po Heung Estate is a public housing estate in Po Heung Street, Tai Po, New Territories, Hong Kong near Tai Po Market, Hong Kong Railway Museum and Tai Po Hui Sports Centre. Formerly the office of Tai Po Rural Committee and Tai Po Temporary Market, the estate consists of two residential blocks completed in 2016.

Houses

Politics
Po Heung Estate is located in Tai Po Hui constituency of the Tai Po District Council. It was formerly represented by Lam Ming-yat, who was elected in the 2019 elections until May 2021.

See also

Public housing estates in Tai Po

References

Residential buildings completed in 2016
Public housing estates in Hong Kong
Tai Po